The Battle of Makahambus Hill was one of the victories won by the Filipinos over the Americans during the Philippine–American War. It was fought on June 4, 1900, in Cagayan de Misamis (now Cagayan de Oro). The Filipinos were under the command of Colonel Apolinar Velez of the Maguindanao Battalion. Most of them were volunteers apart from some Filipino army men who joined.

Background
Col. Pablo Tecson's Bulacan guerrillas, which included his brothers Alipio and Simon, had constructed a number of fortresses in the mountains. On 25 May, they ambushed Capt. Charles D. Roberts' 6 man patrol, killing 3, and taking the rest prisoner, including Capt. Roberts. However, in a humanitarian act, Tecson released the two wounded prisoners, but kept Capt. Roberts captive. The Americans organized a campaign in an attempt to secure Roberts' release.

Battle
The fort at Makahambus was located on a high and steep hill. The Americans seeing how formidable the fort was tried to negotiate a Filipino surrender. The answer was a volley of cannon and rifle fire that drove the Americans back down the hill. Many were killed not by rifle fire, but by booby-trapped pits bristling with sharpened bamboo spears under a camouflage of foliage. The Americans launched repeated counterattacks, only to be driven back by rifle fire from the defenders.

On 4 June, Company E of the 35th was ambushed, followed by Maj. Albert Laws' battalion encountering the fortified hill. Lt. Grover Flint tried to flank the hill but was also ambushed, wounding him and two others. A relief force encountered another concealed trench line, and the Americans realized the fort was impossible to flank, being protected on both sides by gorges. The battalion was pinned down until the Filipinos withdrew.

Aftermath
The American campaign was able to destroy some supply dumps in the search for Roberts, but failed to recapture him.

American losses totaled as many as 20 dead and wounded. There was also one American prisoner of war. The Filipinos, however, suffered only 1 kill and 3 wounded, making this battle a one-sided victory for the Filipinos during the war.

See also
 Battle of Cagayan de Misamis

References

Conflicts in 1900
1900 in the Philippines
Battles of the Philippine–American War
Battles involving the United States
History of Misamis Oriental
Cagayan de Oro
June 1900 events